F.C. Indiana, also known as F.C. Indiana Lionesses, is an American women's soccer team based in Indianapolis, Indiana. Founded in 2003, the team is currently a member of the United Women's Soccer league. They play their home games at Newton Park in Lakeville, Indiana.

The team has an associated men's team, also called F.C. Indiana Lions, who play in the National Premier Soccer League and Premier Arena Soccer League. The club's colors are red and white.

History
In 2005, FC Indiana became the second North American women's team ever to win a league and cup double, capturing the WPSL national championship and the USASA Women's Open national championship (the Carolina Courage of the former Women's United Soccer Association [WUSA] won the Founder's Cup and WUSA league title in 2002).

FC Indiana won the 2005 WPSL title, having defeated host New England Mutiny 4–0 in the 2005 semi-finals and the California Storm 5–4 (featuring internationals Brandi Chastain, Leslie Osborne and Sissi) in the 2005 finals.

In 2007, the club won its second WPSL title in three seasons, defeating the New England Mutiny 3–0. In October 2007, FC Indiana joined the W-League, consistently winning their division before returning to the WPSL for the 2011 season.

In 2012, they participated in the WPSL Elite, finishing at the bottom of the table.

In December 2016, F.C. Indiana joined the newly formed Midwest Conference of United Women's Soccer as an expansion team.

Players

2017 roster

Notable former players 
The following players have played at the international or professional level:

 Aivi Luik
 Sasha Andrews
 Robyn Gayle
 Kelly Parker
 Lauren Sesselmann
 Sharolta Nonen
 Amara Wilson
 Elizabeth Addo
 Adjoa Bayor
 Shanna Hudson
 Elisabetta Tona
 Mizuho Sakaguchi
 Maribel Domínguez
 Judith Flores
 Fátima Leyva
 Mónica Ocampo
 Pamela Tajonar
 Paty Perez
 Guadalupe Worbis
 Ifeanyi Chiejine
 Vera Okolo
 Lisa-Marie Woods
 Elena Danilova
 Elena Terekhova
 Shannon Lynn
 Laura del Río
 María Ruiz
 Noko Matlou
 Veronica Phewa
 Jermaine Seoposengwe
 Julie Augustyniak
 Nancy Augustyniak
 Brittany Bock
 Kerri Hanks
 Kristin Luckenbill
 Jessica O'Rourke
 Erika Prado
 Jordan Clark
 Christie Shaner
 Julianne Sitch

Coaching staff 

General manager and head coach

 Shek Borkowski (2004–)

 Assistant coach

 Christian Castro

 Eric Castro

Year-by-year

Honors
 USL W-League Central Conference Champions 2009
 US Open Cup Champions 2008
 USL W-League Regular Season Champions 2008
 USL W-League Central Conference Champions 2008
 USL W-League Midwest Division Champions 2008
 WPSL Champions 2007
 WPSL Midwest Conference Champions 2007
 US Open Cup Runners-up 2007
 WPSL Champions 2005
 WPSL Central Division Champions 2005
 US Open Cup Champions 2005
 Region 2 Champions 2005

Stadia 
Newton Park 2015–
St. Joe Stadium 2013–2014
IU Michael A. Carroll Track & Soccer Stadium 2012
Kuntz Stadium 2007–2011
Varsity Soccer Complex (Purdue University) 2007
Goshen Soccer Park 2000–2006

Average attendance 

2015: 133
2014: 241
2013: 287
2012: 1,359
2011: 329
2010: NA
2009: 771
2008: 1,012
2007: 557
2006: 911
2005: 723
2004: 105

Memorable Moments 
July 11, 2004 – FC Indiana defeats Australia Women's National Team 1–0.
July 19, 2005 – FC Indiana defeats Trinidad & Tobago Women's National Team 3–0.
July 21, 2005 – FC Indiana defeats Trinidad & Tobago Women's National Team 8–3.
July 31, 2005 – After winning 4–0 over host New England Mutiny, FC Indiana upsets the defending champions California Storm 5–4, winning the Women's Premier Soccer League national championship.
August 6, 2005 – Six days after winning the Women's Premier Soccer League title, FC Indiana defeats the Dallas SC Titans 4–0 in the U.S. Open Cup national final, achieving the second "double" in American women's soccer history.
July 29, 2007 – FC Indiana defeats the New England Mutiny 3–0 to win its second WPSL title in three years.
August 15, 2007 – FC Indiana defeats New Zealand Women's National Team 1–0.

See also
F.C. Indiana (NPSL)
United Women's Soccer
Women's Premier Soccer League Elite
Women's Premier Soccer League
W-League

References

External links
F.C. Indiana

   

 
Women's soccer clubs in Indiana
Sports teams in Indianapolis
Association football clubs established in 2000
2000 establishments in Indiana
Women's Premier Soccer League Elite teams
Women's Premier Soccer League teams
United Women's Soccer teams